The Chiesa del Calvario ("Church of Calvary") is a church located in Santo Stefano di Camastra in Sicily.

History 
The Calvary church is located near the cemetery, in Via Convento, Santo Stefano di Camastra, in the province of Messina in Sicily. Owned by the Sergio family, it was built at the beginning of the 19th  century on the site of the former chapel of the Capuchin convent by the future bishop of the diocese of Cefalù, Giovanni Sergio, dedicated to Our Lady of Seven Sorrows. In 1992, it was declared a "property of particular historical and artistic interest" by a regional decree.

References

Churches in the metropolitan city of Messina